St Mary's Church is an Anglican parish church in Beverley in the East Riding of Yorkshire, England. It is designated a Grade I listed building.

History 
St Mary's was established in the first half of the 12th century as a daughter church of Beverley Minster, to serve Beverley's trading community. It is a cruciform church, 197 feet in length, with aisled nave and chancel, south transept with east aisle, north transept with east chapel and crypt below, northeast chapel with adjoining sacristy and priests’ rooms above, and a crossing tower.

A few 12th and early 13th century fragments remain scattered throughout the church. These are numerous enough to determine that by the mid-13th century, the church consisted of an aisle-less chancel and transepts, an aisled nave, and probably a crossing tower.

Systematic rebuilding began in the late 13th century, during the Decorated period, when a large chapel was added on to the east side of the north transept. This was followed  by the addition of a south aisle to the previously aisle-less chancel, in conjunction with a widening of east aisle of the south transept. The nave aisles were completely rebuilt in the early 14th century. In the 1330s or 1340s the chancel was given a north aisle, the three easternmost bays of which were made into a superb chapel with Flowing tracery and a tierceron-star vault. The mouldings of the tracery, windows, vault, and piers all merge fluidly with each other, unifying the space. The mouldings of the vault ribs on the north wall spring from the floor and form fluted columns without capitals, and on the south wall spring from the column capitals, intersecting and running through the arcade mouldings.

Building work at St Mary's ceased in the mid-14th century, as in so many cases throughout England, because of the Black Death. It did not resume until , when the west front was rebuilt in the Perpendicular style and a Perpendicular clerestory was added to the nave. The south porch and a clerestory for the chancel followed in the early 15th century. The transepts were rebuilt with clerestories in the mid-15th century; the Early Gothic arches were reused, but set on new piers. Bequests for this work were made in 1451–3, and further bequests in 1498–1500 funded the rebuilding of the west end of the nave aisles. Also installed throughout the 15th and into the 16th centuries were the series of fine wooden ceilings for which the building is known. The most recognized is the chancel ceiling, originally of the mid-15th century but entirely repainted in 1863, with depictions of forty English kings from the mythical Brutus through Henry VI, and a portrait of George VI from 1939.

During Evensong on 29 April 1520, the central tower collapsed, ‘and overwhelmed some that then were in [the church]’. Much of the work on the eastern end of the nave was undone, though the aisle walls were little damaged. The central tower and the nave arcades and clerestory were entirely rebuilt, though the clerestory windows appear to be of : Pevsner suggests that "[p]ossibly they were reused in spite of the radical damage done by the falling tower". This rebuilding work began immediately after the collapse, the south arcade bearing an inscribed date of 1524 at both east and west ends. 
William Rokeby,  Archbishop of Dublin,  a Yorkshire man, at his death  the following  year left £200 in  his  will for the  rebuilding works.  Those who gave money for the piers of the north arcade are commemorated in inscriptions on the hoodmould stops: merchant John Crossley and his wife; the good wives of Beverley; and the minstrels, five of whom are depicted as statues on corbels against their pier.

The present font dates from 1530, the gift of a Beverley draper, William Leryffax. Made of Derbyshire marble, it is richly ornamented with a defaced inscription.

The 19th century saw significant restoration undertaken at St. Mary's, in 1829–30 under William Comins, then under A. W. N. Pugin in 1844–52. E. W. Pugin took over the work, and was followed by Cuthbert Brodrick, George Gilbert Scott (who refitted the nave and chancel), and numerous other architects.

In 2020, the restoration of the stonework started with the replacement of some weathered stone carvings with newly commissioned figures based on characters from The Chronicles of Narnia books by C. S. Lewis.

In 2021, as part of a programme of celebrating women in the restoration of the stonework of the church, it was announced that stone figures of nine women will include Hull born pilot and engineer Amy Johnson, and Hilda Lyon the aeronautical engineer educated at Beverley High School will feature alongside Mary Wollstonecraft, Mary Seacole, Marie Curie, Rosalind Franklin, Helen Sharman and Ada Lovelace and Queen Elizabeth II.

Organ
According to George Oliver (writing 1829), an organ built by Donaldson of York was placed in the rood loft at the east end of the nave in 1792, at a cost raised by voluntary subscription of £311, the subscribers appointing a Mr Lambert as organist. In 1869, Messrs Forster and Andrews built a new organ, said to 'boast a richly carved oak screen with handsomely decorated front pipes'. In 1889 the same latter firm installed a detached console besides the choir stalls and pneumatic action was added throughout. In 1908 it was completely rebuilt by Messrs Lewis & Co of London, when the oak case of the previous organ was discarded. In 1954 a major overhaul was carried out by local firm Messrs Hall & Broadfield who replaced the pneumatic action with an electro-magnetic mechanism and transformed the three-manual organ into a four-manual instrument. The completed rebuild was dedicated in 1957.

See also
Grade I listed churches in the East Riding of Yorkshire

References

External links

St Mary's Church, Beverley

Beverley
Church of England church buildings in the East Riding of Yorkshire
1120 establishments in England
Grade I listed churches in the East Riding of Yorkshire